Charles A. Sprague High School, known as Sprague High School, is a high school in the Sunnyslope neighborhood of Salem, Oregon, United States. The school is named after Charles A. Sprague, who served as Oregon's governor from 1939 to 1943.

Academics
In the 2017–18 school year, 87.9% of Sprague's seniors received a high school diploma, compared to a statewide rate of 77%.  Of 365 students, 321 graduated and 30 dropped out.

In the 2017–18 school year, Sprague's test scores were significantly higher than the state averages. In English, Sprague had 84% of students meeting state standards compared to the 70% state average, 46% in math compared to 33% statewide, and 81% in science compared to the 54% state average.

The racial makeup of Sprague currently consists of 74% white, 11% Hispanic, with all other races compiling the other 15%.

Music activities

Grammy Signature School recognition
Sprague has been recognized as a Grammy Signature School in many years. This program is designed to honor exceptional public high school music programs across the country.
 2009: GRAMMY Signature Schools
 2008: GRAMMY Signature Schools
 2000: National GRAMMY Signature School
 1999: GRAMMY Signature Schools Gold

Orchestra
Since the orchestral program was created in 1986, Sprague's Camerata Orchestra and Symphony Orchestra have won a combined 25 Oregon School Activities Association (OSAA) State Championships, and the program flourished under the direction of Steve A. Nelson. In addition, Sprague is the only high school in Oregon to have won state championships in all four OSAA music categories (String Orchestra, Full Orchestra, Choir, and Band) in a single year (1998). Beginning in 1993, and every fourth year until 2005 (1997, 2001, 2005), Sprague's Orchestra Program has traveled to Austria, where the Camerata has been named the "Top High School String Orchestra in the World" on multiple occasions after winning the Vienna Youth and Music Festival in 1997 and 2005. The orchestras are currently directed by Lisa Rael.

State Championships: 
Full Orchestra: 1988, 1996–99, 2001–03, 2006, 2011
String Orchestra: 1990, 1993, 1995–2000, 2002, 2004–06, 2009–11

Choir
Choir director Russ Christensen was named the 2006-2007 Oregon Music Educator of the year.  The choir placed or tied for first in OSAA state choir championships in 1998, 2003, 2004, 2005, 2006, 2007, 2009, 2012, and 2017. The choir is now directed by Dr. Robert David Brown.

Bands
Sprague High School Marching Band and Color Guard won the Oregon state championship in 1984, 1985, and 1986. They won the Kelso Highlander Marching band competition in 1983. The marching band competed in the California state championships in San Jose in 1984, coming in second place by only 3/4 of a point. They also took first place at the Bands of America regional championship in Moscow, Idaho in 1985. The color guard, named the Starlighters Winterguard, won the Western Dream Pageant Scholastic division with the highest score up to that point in 1986, having an undefeated season. In 2017, under the direction of Dr. Richard Greenwood, the band won the 6A OSAA state championship for the first time since 2012.

State Championships: 1998, 2001, 2003–07, 2009, 2012, 2017

The band is a member of Northwest Association for Performing Arts and Oregon School Activities Association.

Sprague has hosted the Pacific Coast Invitational, a marching band competition, since 1982.

Concert Band
Sprague band has participated in many Heritage Festivals in Anaheim and San Francisco, California over the years.  Below is list of the accomplishments by participation year:

Marching band accolades
The first two months of each school year is marching band season.  To start the season off, two weeks in August are devoted to marching band camp.  Members of Sprague Band assemble with the Color Guard practice drills, straighten lines and create a show for competition with other high school marching bands within Oregon, Washington, California, and Idaho.  Most are members of the Northwest Association of Performing Artists.

Athletics
Sprague now competes in the 6A Central Valley Conference, re-established in 2022.  The other teams in the conference are also from Salem and Keizer: McNary, North Salem, South Salem, West Salem.

Sprague has won ten state championships in various sports, including six Directors Cup trophies for league standings in all sports throughout a school year.

During the 2004-2005 school year, Sprague won both the football and baseball state championships, marking the first time since 1998 that a major Oregon high school was a state champion in two of the "Big 3" (football, basketball, and baseball) in the same year. Sprague has also had a very successful tennis program. Between 2006 and 2009, the boys' tennis team won the team state championship and had a player in the singles final in three out of four years (2006, 2007, 2009).

Sprague has one of the best high school racquetball teams in the nation. They have 7 state and 6 national titles, along with numerous individual player titles. The team swept the state championship in 2018, 2019, 2020, and 2022. They have been in the top 2 high school racquetball teams for over a decade.

State Championships
 Football: 2004
 Boys' tennis: 1977, 1993, 1997, 2006, 2007, 2009
 Baseball: 1995, 2005
 Softball: 2003
 Racquetball: 1998, 2008, 2017, 2018, 2019, 2020, 2022 (club sport)
National Champions 
 Racquetball: 1998, 2008, 2009, 2011, 2013, 2019, 2020 (club sport)
State Championship Appearances
 Boys Cross Country: 1972, 1980, 1984, 1989–91, 1999-2000, 2004
 Girls Cross Country: 1978–81, 1986–87, 1989, 1992, 1996–97, 2007, 2015–17
 Volleyball: 2018
 Girls Basketball: 1989
 Boys Basketball: 1989, 1996–97
 Boys Swimming: 1974–78, 1986, 1990–95, 2002–03, 2007–08, 2011, 2015, 2017–18
 Girls Swimming: 1976–78, 1985, 1990–97, 1999-2000, 2002–15, 2017–18
 Wrestling: 1979-82, 1984–85, 1988, 1991–18
 Baseball: 1995, 2005
 Boys Golf: 1976, 1979–80, 1992–93, 1999–2003, 2007–08, 2011–12
 Girls Golf: 2000–01, 2007, 2012–14, 2018
 Softball: 1989, 1992, 1994, 2003, 2005
 Boys Tennis: 1974–79, 1982–83, 1985, 1988–18
 Girls Tennis: 1977, 1980–85, 1988, 1990–92, 1994, 1996–98, 2004–14, 2018
 Boys Track and Field: 1974–76, 1978–82, 1984–85, 1989–94, 1997, 2000–12, 2014–17
 Girls Track and Field: 1975–77, 1979–83, 1986, 1988–89, 1992, 1995–98, 2001–04, 2007, 2010–14, 2017

Notable alumni
 Joey Wong, baseball player
 Bill Swancutt, NFL football player Sportspeople from Salem, Oregon

References

Educational institutions established in 1972
High schools in Salem, Oregon
Public high schools in Oregon
1972 establishments in Oregon